Senator Outlaw may refer to:

Alexander Outlaw (1738–1826), Tennessee State Senate
George Outlaw (1771–1825), North Carolina State Senate